The PWS-10 was a Polish fighter aircraft,  constructed in the PWS (Podlaska Wytwórnia Samolotów - Podlasie Aircraft Factory). It was the first Polish-designed fighter to enter serial production.

Design and development
First work on a domestic fighter to replace ill-fated French SPAD 61s in the Polish Air Force was initiated by PWS in 1927. The main designers were Aleksander Grzędzielski and  Augustyn Zdaniewski. In 1929 the prototype was built and it first flew in March 1930. At the same time, the more modern fighter PZL P.1 was developed by the PZL. Despite the P.1 being a more capable fighter, the War Ministry decided that it needed further work, and a series of 80 PWS-10 was ordered as a temporary measure. In comparison with the advanced P.1, the PWS-10 was a more classic design, a high-wing parasol monoplane of mixed construction.

The series was built from 1931 to 1932, numbered from 5-1 to 5-80.

A variant of PWS-10 was a biplane PWS-15, being PWS-10 with another pair of wings. A single prototype was made to compare with a monoplane, on the factory's initiative. It first flew in the spring of 1931. It offered better maneuverability and climb ratio with a slightly lower maximum speed. PWS-15 was not produced and was soon broken up.

Description
Mixed construction high-wing parasol monoplane, canvas and plywood covered. A fuselage of a metal frame, covered with duralumin in the front section and canvas in the rear section. Two-spar elliptic wings, of wooden construction, canvas, and plywood covered. Stabilizers, rudder, and elevator of metal construction, canvas-covered. Open pilot's cockpit, with a windshield. Conventional fixed landing gear, with a rear skid. Engine: 12-cylinder water-cooled inline W engine Lorraine-Dietrich LD-12Eb, built by license in Polish Skoda Works. Water radiator under a fuselage front. Two-blade wooden propeller of a fixed pitch. Fuel tank 280 L in a fuselage. Armament: two fixed 7.7 mm Vickers machineguns with interrupter gear, in hull sides.

Operational history
PWS-10 entered service in the Polish Air Force starting from 1932. It was used in cadres nos. 122, 131, 132, 141. Their flight characteristics and performance were mediocre. As soon, as in 1933 they were replaced in combat units by PZL P.7 and moved to aviation school in Dęblin. Some were used there by the outbreak of World War II and in summer 1939 all remaining airworthy aircraft were gathered in Ułęż.

In late 1936, during the Spanish Civil War, 20 PWS-10 were sold in secret to the Spanish Nationalists, via Portugal, by the SEPEWE syndicate. Aircraft were transported in crates and were assembled by PZL workers. First aircraft was flown in December 1936 in Leon. Being obsolete by then, they were not used as fighters, only for fighter pilot training (for 4. Fighter Group) in El Copero near Seville. Later PWS-10s were transferred to Jerez de la Frontera where they flew between April 1937 and the end of 1938.
Spanish aircraft received the name Chiquita, or unofficial Pavipollo and they had numbers from 4-1 to 4-20. Some were lost in crashes or scrapped, the remaining 11 were operated till the end of the 1938 and were retired in 1939.

During the German invasion of Poland in September 1939, they were too obsolete to be used in combat, but some were used for reconnaissance flights in an improvised Dęblin Group during first days of the war.

Variants
 PWS-10 : Single-seat fighter biplane.
 PWS-10M : This was the original designation of the PWS-10.
 PWS-15 : PWS-10 with a new wing, one conversion only, not successful.

Operators

Polish Air Force

Spanish Air Force

Specifications

See also

References

Bibliography

Further reading

External links

Photos and drawings at Ugolok Neba
PWS in Spanish Army

PWS aircraft
1930s Polish fighter aircraft
Parasol-wing aircraft
Single-engined tractor aircraft
Aircraft first flown in 1930